Tolga Uprak (17 October 1980) is a Turkish professional motorcycle racer. He competes in the Turkish Superbike Championship.

Uprak raced in 2002 in the Turkish Championship winning the round at the İzmit Körfez Circuit. He won the race at Izmir-Pınarbaşı in 2004. He raced in 2006 in the Turkish Championship's Supersport Category A.

In 2010, he was conscripted in to the army, and had so to stay away from racing.

In 2012, he won the six-round Turkish championship for the 1000cc Category A and the TMF Grand Prix. Riding for CMS –EYP Bike Racing Team on Ducati 852, he leads the 2013 Turkish Championship Supersport A with 85 points after the fourth leg.

Gaining a wildcard, Uprak raced at the 2013 Superbike World Championship's İstanbul Park round for the team CMS –EYP Bike Racing on Kawasaki ZX-10R. After starting at grid 13, he placed 13th in the Race 1 and 14th in the Race 2. He took 5 points in total.

Career statistics

 * Season still in progress

Superbike World Championship

References

1980 births
Living people
Turkish motorcycle racers
Superbike World Championship riders
Place of birth missing (living people)